The Bend SuperSprint (formally known as the OTR SuperSprint – The Bend) is an annual motor racing event for Supercars, held at The Bend Motorsport Park in Tailem Bend, South Australia since 2018. In 2020, after originally being intended to be an endurance race of 500km, the Tailem Bend races were re-purposed as two consecutive sprint race weekends in a revised calendar due to the COVID-19 pandemic.

Format
The event is held over two days, from Saturday to Sunday. On Saturday, two practice sessions, then a three-part knock-out qualifying session are held, for the 100 kilometre race to follow. Sunday features two ten-minute qualifying sessions that set the grid for each of the day's two 100 km races.

Other than the second 2020 event, all events have run on the 4.9km "International" configuration of the circuit. The second 2020 event used the shorter "West" layout. The event is also open to "wildcard" entries, allowing teams and drivers from the Super2 Series support category to take part in the top tier.

History

The Bend Motorsport Park, the first permanent circuit to be opened in Australia since Queensland Raceway in 1999, signed a memorandum of understanding to host a future Supercars race early in the construction process in 2015. Following final approval from the Government of South Australia, the circuit was added to the 2018 calendar with an August date, the first time the state has held two championship events in a season since Adelaide International Raceway hosted two rounds in 1977. The inaugural event was dominated by Triple Eight Race Engineering, with two poles and two race victories shared between Shane van Gisbergen and Jamie Whincup. The 2019 event was again dominated by a single team, with DJR Team Penske's Scott McLaughlin winning both races from pole position. 

From 2020, the sprint event was due to be replaced on the championship calendar by a new endurance race at the circuit. The endurance event was then dropped in a shortened calendar due to the COVID-19 pandemic. In a further revision to the calendar, caused by border restrictions, a double-header SuperSprint was added to the calendar to be held in September 2020 on consecutive weekends. In the first of the two events the wins were again shared between Triple Eight and DJR Team Penske, with championship combatants McLaughlin and Whincup clashing in the first race of the weekend, resulting in a penalty for Whincup. Fabian Coulthard won the round, with team-mate McLaughlin winning the second round, held for the first time on the circuit's West layout, and in doing so securing his third consecutive Supercars Championship.

In 2021, the event was the only South Australian event following the demise of the Adelaide 500 (the event later returned in 2022). Ford won all three races over the weekend, including Andre Heimgartner's first career win, however Shane van Gisbergen won the round in Holden's final scheduled year in the championship.

Winners

Notes
  – The Bend Motorsport Park hosted two events of the 2020 Supercars Championship. The second event was the only event to date to use the circuit's West layout. All other events have used the International layout.

Multiple winners

By driver

By team

By manufacturer

Event names and sponsors
2018–onwards: OTR SuperSprint – The Bend
2020: Repco SuperSprint – The Bend

See also
List of Australian Touring Car Championship races

References

Motorsport in South Australia
Recurring sporting events established in 2018
Supercars Championship races
2018 establishments in Australia